Jim Sprott (born April 11, 1969) is a Canadian former professional ice hockey defenceman.

Sprott played major junior hockey with the London Knights of the Ontario Hockey League. He was drafted 51st overall in the 3rd round by the Quebec Nordiques. He then went on to play 16 seasons in the minor leagues before retiring as a professional player following the 2006–07 season.

Career statistics

References

1969 births
Canadian ice hockey defencemen
Living people
Bossier-Shreveport Mudbugs players
Brantford Smoke players
Fort Wayne Komets players
Greensboro Monarchs players
Halifax Citadels players
Ice hockey people from Ontario
London Knights players
New Haven Nighthawks players
Peoria Rivermen (IHL) players
San Antonio Iguanas players
Shreveport Mudbugs players
South Carolina Stingrays players
Sportspeople from Oakville, Ontario
St. John's Maple Leafs players